The Corumbataí River is river of Paraná which is a state in southern Brazil.

See also
List of rivers of Paraná

References

Brazilian Ministry of Transport

Rivers of Paraná (state)